Four-time defending champions Martina Navratilova and Pam Shriver successfully defended their title, defeating Zina Garrison and Lori McNeil in the final, 6–1, 6–0 to win the women's doubles tennis title at the 1987 Australian Open.

Seeds

Draw

Finals

Top half

Bottom half

External links
 1987 Australian Open – Women's draws and results at the International Tennis Federation

Women's Doubles
Australian Open (tennis) by year – Women's doubles
1987 in Australian women's sport
1987 in women's tennis